P. Malaichamy was an Indian politician and former Member of the Legislative Assembly of Tamil Nadu. He was elected to the Tamil Nadu legislative assembly as a Dravida Munnetra Kazhagam candidate from Melur North constituency in 1967 election, and from Melur constituency in 1971 election.

References 

Dravida Munnetra Kazhagam politicians
Year of birth missing
Possibly living people
Tamil Nadu MLAs 1971–1976